The geology of Sint Maarten consists of andesite tuff and tuff breccia from the middle and late Eocene, intruded by hypabyssal basalt, quartz diorite and younger andesite. Volcanic activity led to metamorphism of many rocks and the tilting and folding of the tuff series. Limestone and marl was later unconformably deposited atop the eroded volcanic rocks as volcanic activity shifted elsewhere.

References

Geography of Sint Maarten
Natural history of Sint Maarten
Sint Maarten
Sint Maarten